Glareola is a genus of birds in the family Glareolidae. The pratincoles are a group of birds consisting of the seven species of this genus and the Australian pratincole, the only species of the genus Stiltia.

The genus Glareola was introduced by the French zoologist Mathurin Jacques Brisson in 1760 with the collared pratincole (Glareola pratincola) as the type species.  The genus name is a diminutive of  Latin glarea, "gravel", referring to a typical nesting habitat.

Species list
The genus contains seven species:
Collared pratincole (Glareola pratincola)
Oriental pratincole (Glareola maldivarum)
Black-winged pratincole (Glareola nordmanni)
Madagascar pratincole (Glareola ocularis)
Rock pratincole (Glareola nuchalis)
Grey pratincole (Glareola cinerea)
Small pratincole (Glareola lactea)

References

 
Bird genera
Taxa named by Mathurin Jacques Brisson